The Crusades Through Arab Eyes is a French language historical essay by Lebanese author Amin Maalouf.

As the name suggests, the book is a narrative retelling of primary sources drawn from various Arab chronicles that seeks to provide an Arab perspective on the Crusades, and especially regarding the Crusaders – the (Franj), as the Arabs called them – who were considered cruel, savage, ignorant and culturally backward.

From the first invasion in the eleventh century through till the general collapse of the Crusades in the thirteenth century, the book constructs a narrative that is the reverse of that common in the Western world, describing the main facts as bellicose and displaying situations of a quaint historic setting, where Western Christians are viewed as "barbarians," and unaware of the most elementary rules of honor, dignity and social ethics.

References

 

Books about the Crusades
1984 non-fiction books
Works by Amin Maalouf
Arab history
French non-fiction books
Schocken Books books